Rudolf "Rudi" Nierlich (20 February 1966 – 18 May 1991) was an Austrian alpine skier. Born in Sankt Wolfgang im Salzkammergut (Upper Austria), he won a total of eight races in the Alpine Skiing World Cup, and was three times World Champion (1989 and 1991), in Slalom and Giant Slalom.

Death
He died  in May 1991 in a traffic collision in Sankt Wolfgang im Salzkammergut.

World Cup victories

World Championship results

Europa Cup results
Nierlich has won a overall Europa Cup and one specialty standings.

FIS Alpine Ski Europa Cup
Overall: 1986
Giant slalom: 1986

References

External links
 
 

1966 births
1991 deaths
Austrian male alpine skiers
Alpine skiers at the 1988 Winter Olympics
Olympic alpine skiers of Austria
Road incident deaths in Austria
People from Gmunden District
Sportspeople from Upper Austria